The School is a band based in Wales, founded in 2007. In 2008, they released their first single, All I Wanna Do, and their first EP, Let It Slip. Their debut album was Loveless Unbeliever, and was released in 2010. Their second album was titled Reading Too Much Into Things Like Everything, and was released in 2012.
Their label is Elefant Records.

Discography

Albums 
Loveless Unbeliever (Elefant Records, 2010)
Reading Too Much Into Things Like Everything (Elefant Records, 2012)
Wasting Away And Wondering (Elefant Records, 2015)

Singles 
All I Wanna Do/Valentine (Elefant Records, 2008)
And Suddenly - split with George Washington Brown (Slumberland Records, 2009)
Is He Really Coming Home? - promo (Elefant Records, 2010)
Never Thought I'd See The Day (Elefant Records, 2012)
When I Fall In Love (Where It's At Is Where You Are, 2014)
All I Want From You Is Everything (Elefant Records, 2015)
When I Fall In Love (Pagan Wanderer Lu Remix) - split with The Yearning (Kingfisher Bluez, 2015)

Extended plays 
Let It Slip (Elefant Records, 2008)

References

External links
 The School official website
 The School official bandcamp
 Band page at Elefant Records

Welsh pop music groups
Musical groups from Cardiff